Todd's Welfare Society (TWS) is an animal rescue and animal welfare nonprofit organization established on 6 March 2016 to protect injured, sick, abandoned and neglected animals in Lahore, Pakistan. TWS provides shelter, medical assistance, rehabilitation and homes for animals. TWS also educates and create awareness regarding the plight of animals in Pakistan. 

TWS is working towards building the first No-kill animal shelter in Lahore. Currently they are helping animals from different foster homes.

History 

Todd's Welfare Society was started on 6 March 2016 after an incident in which a dog, later named Joanne, was shot multiple times in the face by guards in Lahore on 5 March 2016. Joanne's killing shocked Kiran Maheen, and to prevent such incidents from occurring again, TWS was formed the very next day. TWS was named in the memory of Kiran Maheen's pet dog Toddy, who was stolen outside his home in April 2010 and never found.

Vision 
TWS envisions an animal friendly community; a society where stray animals are not killed; where every companion animal is spayed and neutered; where every animal and pet is treated kindly, with respect and compassion

Services 
Their services include:
 Animal Rescue
 Animal Relocation
 Animal Aid
 Foster
 Awareness Programs
 Adoptions

Work 
Since March 2016, TWS has rescued over 200 cats, dogs, eagles and donkeys. From those rescued, over 50 animals have been successfully adopted.

Todd's Welfare Society has over 15 permanent members, over 30 volunteers and a steady volunteer program with different schools (LGSi & TNS). Over the course of 10 months (June'16 - March'17), more than 60 volunteers have worked with TWS to conduct regular field visits and awareness drives with different schools in Lahore. Kiran Maheen, has also been invited to different events, such as TEDx Sialkot and TEDx Lahore, to talk about her work, and to inspire people to stand up for animal rights.

Apart from having a foster home in Cavalry, they have also rented new premises for another foster home in Burki, and have acquired land to start construction of their shelter.

Future aim 
TWS wants to open the first, state of the art, no-kill animal shelter in Lahore. TWS also aims to start massive TNR program in Punjab to decrease the population of dogs and cats and to decrease the occurrence of rabies in animals. They also want to start yearly awareness conferences and have programs in different schools and universities where they can learn more about animal rights and care.

References

External links 
 TWS Facebook
 TWS Twitter
 TWS Instagram

Animal welfare organisations based in Pakistan
Animal shelters
Animal rights
Non-profit organisations based in Pakistan
Organizations established in 2016